Mehan (also Romanized as Mahn and Mīhan) is a village in Poshtkuh Rural District, in the Central District of Firuzkuh County, Tehran Province, Iran. At the 2006 census, its population was 541, in 127 families.

References 

Populated places in Firuzkuh County